Crataegus jackii is a hawthorn that is restricted to southern Quebec. It is related to and has been considered to be a synonym of C. chrysocarpa, but is very hairy, with larger flowers, and has been made a synonym of C. lumaria Ashe.

References

jackii
Flora of North America